A split-rail fence, log fence, or buck-and-rail fence (also historically known as a zigzag, worm, snake or snake-rail fence due to its meandering layout) is a type of fence constructed in the United States and Canada, and is made out of timber logs, usually split lengthwise into rails and typically used for agricultural or decorative fencing.  Such fences require much more timber than other types of fences, and so are generally only common in areas where wood is abundant.  However, they are very simple in their construction, and can be assembled with few tools even on hard or rocky ground.  They also can be built without using any nails or other hardware; such hardware was often scarce in frontier areas. They are particularly popular in very rocky areas where post hole digging is almost impossible. They can even be partially or wholly disassembled if the fence needs to be moved or the wood becomes more useful for other purposes. 

Split rail fences were made of easy to split, rot-resistant wood. Traditionally American chestnut was the timber of choice until chestnut blight eliminated this tree. Currently, most split rails are made from cedar. Each half was then split into quarters, then eighths and so on until the rails were of a usable size. A log may produce from four rails from an  log to over a dozen from larger logs. The rails are stacked on top of one another. Most split rail fences have the rails stacked in an interlocking zig-zag fashion that is self-supporting, easy to create, easy to repair, and easy to disassemble.

Some timber fences have the rails stacked directly on top of each other and secured with double fence posts (one on either side of the rails). This made a more permanent and compact fence but remained easy to repair.

The distance between either the zigs or the zags is generally  or one rod.



Buck-and-rail fence

A buck-and-rail, or buck-and-post, fence is a timber fence which is a three-dimensional, A-frame, rail fence. Each section of fencing consists of two standing vertical A-frames between which are four to seven horizontal rails or poles, the number depending on the height of fencing wanted. Except for at the end of the fence, each A-frame is used by two horizontal sections, one to the right, and one to the left. For the enclosure of livestock such as cows and sheep, a four-foot (1.22 m) high fence using four rails is sufficient. Taller fences of 6-7 feet (1,83-2.13 m) are required for big game such as deer and elk, as the three-dimensional quality of the fence discourages jumping over it; a 9-10 foot (2.74-3.04 m) wire fence would be needed for the same purpose.

Buck-and-rail fencing was ubiquitous in battlefields in the Eastern Theater of the American Civil War, because of the proximity of forested land and their ease of construction. These split rail fences were a major source of firewood for both the Union and Confederate armies. 

Modern buck-and-rail fences are expensive, costing $4.00 per foot in 1995 and $6 per foot in 2001 in the United States. While easy to construct, building them is physically demanding.

Buck-and-rail fences are ecologically positive, in that while they do the job of keeping larger animals in or out, smaller wildlife can pass through them easily, and they can be readily climbed over by people.  Furthermore, being made of timber, they are less intrusive on the landscape, and, over time, naturally breakdown.

Mortised fence
In the United Kingdom (and increasingly in suburban America) a different style of split-rail fence is used.  This is not free-standing but consists of vertical posts placed in the ground, having holes (mortises) in each side into which the roughly pointed ends of split rails (usually of sweet chestnut) are placed.  No zig-zagging is necessary.  This style is commonly used as decorative fencing, or for horse-keeping. Such fences are a specific type of a more general form, called post-and-rail fences.

Patent cedar fence
In Canada an attempt was made to patent several cedar fence designs.  These styles became known as Patent Cedar Fences, also called Patent Fences or Patent Rail Fences.  The use of two rails to form a cross, having a top rail, bench rails and lower heavier rails, allowed it to be free standing, withstand heavy winds and take up less fence bottom than the zigzag or snake fence.

See also
 Roundpole fence

References

External links

Fences